Polydontomyia is a genus of rat-tail maggot flies in the family Syrphidae. The genus is monotypic, comprising a single species, Polydontomyia curvipes, also known as the dimorphic sickleleg. It was formerly a member of the genus Lejops.

References

External links

 
 

Eristalinae
Monotypic Diptera genera
Insects described in 1830